Old Yeller is a 1956 children's novel written by Fred Gipson and illustrated by Carl Burger. It received a Newbery Honor in 1957. The title is taken from the name of the yellow dog who is the center of the book's story. In 1957, Walt Disney released a film adaptation starring Tommy Kirk, Fess Parker, Dorothy McGuire, Kevin Corcoran, Jeff York, and Beverly Washburn.

Plot
In the late 1860s in the fictional town of Salt Licks, Texas, young Travis Coates has been working to take care of his family ranch with his mother and younger brother, Arliss, while his father goes off on a cattle drive. When a "dingy yellow" dog comes for an unasked stay with the family, Travis reluctantly takes in the dog, which they name Old Yeller. The name has a double meaning: the fur color yellow pronounced as "yeller" and the fact that its bark sounds more like a human yell.

Though Travis initially loathes the "rascal" and at first tries to get rid of it, the dog eventually proves his worth, saving the family on several occasions; rescuing Arliss from a bear, Travis from a bunch of wild hogs, and Mama and their friend Lisbeth from a loafer wolf. Travis grows to love Old Yeller, and they become great friends. The rightful owner of Yeller shows up looking for his dog and recognizing that the family has become attached to Yeller, trades the dog to Arliss for a horned toad and a home-cooked meal prepared by Travis' mother, who is an exceptional cook.

Old Yeller is bitten while saving his family from a rabid wolf. Travis is faced with the harsh decision that he must kill Old Yeller after the fight with the wolf, which he does because he cannot risk Old Yeller becoming sick and turning on the family. Old Yeller had puppies with one of Travis' friend's dogs, and one of the puppies helps Travis get over Old Yeller's death. They take in the new dog and try to begin a fresh start.

Breed 
Old Yeller in the novel is described as being a "yellow cur". It has been claimed that the dog was actually modeled after the Yellow or Southern Black Mouth Cur or a Blue Lacy, the state dog of Texas. In the Disney movie Yeller was portrayed by a yellow Labrador Retriever/Mastiff mix.

Inspiration

The inspiration for the dog Old Yeller was based on a dog named Rattler from Mason, Texas.

Other books in the series
The new puppy becomes the title character of the follow-up book Savage Sam (1962) and 1963 movie. A third book, Little Arliss (1978), is set after the first two and features Travis' younger brother.

Awards and honors
1957 Newbery Honor
1959 William Allen White Children's Book Award
1959 Young Reader's Choice Award
1959 Sequoyah Book Award, Children's category (inaugural winner) 
1966 Nēnē Award

References

1956 American novels
Novels set in the 1860s
Novels set in Texas
American children's novels
Newbery Honor-winning works
American novels adapted into films
Novels about dogs
Fictional dogs
Harper & Brothers books
Children's novels about animals
1956 children's books
Rabies in popular culture